Jonas Almtorp (born November 17, 1983) is a Swedish former professional ice hockey player who last played competitively with AIK IF in the HockeyAllsvenskan (Allsv).

Playing career
He played in Brynäs IF 2005–2007, but moved to play with the Edmonton Oilers in the National Hockey League (NHL) before the 2007–08 season. He did not play any NHL, as he did not make the Oilers team, and only played in the AHL and ECHL. Before the 2007–08 season he returned to Elitserien to play in Luleå Hockey.

After three seasons with Linköpings HC, Almtorp left Sweden for only the second time in his career, in signing a one-year contract with Austrian club, Graz 99ers of the EBEL on September 9, 2015.

Almtorp is brother-in-law of Italian ice hockey player Max Oberrauch.

Career statistics

Regular season and playoffs

International

References

External links

1983 births
Living people
AIK IF players
Almtuna IS players
Brynäs IF players
Djurgårdens IF Hockey players
Edmonton Oilers draft picks
Graz 99ers players
Linköping HC players
Luleå HF players
Modo Hockey players
Sportspeople from Uppsala
Södertälje SK players
Springfield Falcons players
Stockton Thunder players
IF Sundsvall Hockey players
Swedish ice hockey centres
Swedish expatriate ice hockey players in the United States